The 1976 United States presidential election in Nebraska took place on November 2, 1976, as part of the 1976 United States presidential election. Voters chose five representatives, or electors, to the Electoral College, who voted for president and vice president.

Nebraska was won by incumbent President Gerald Ford (R–Michigan), with 59.19% of the popular vote, against Jimmy Carter (D–Georgia), with 38.46% of the popular vote. None of the third-party candidates amounted to a significant portion of the vote, but Eugene McCarthy (I–Minnesota) won 1.55% of Nebraska's popular vote and came third overall in the nation. Despite losing in Nebraska, Carter went on to win the national election and became the 39th president of the United States. , this is the last election in which Butler County, Sherman County, and Greeley County voted for a Democratic presidential candidate.

With 59.19% of the popular vote, Nebraska, where Ford was born as Leslie Lynch King in 1913, proved to be the incumbent President’s fourth strongest state in the 1976 election after Utah, Idaho and Wyoming.

Results

Results by county

See also
 United States presidential elections in Nebraska

References

Nebraska
1976
1976 Nebraska elections